Thanks for Every New Morning is a 1994 Czech film directed by Milan Šteindler. It was the Czech Republic's submission to the 68th Academy Awards for the Academy Award for Best Foreign Language Film, but was not accepted as a nominee.

Cast and characters
 Ivana Chýlková as Olga
 Franciszek Pieczka as father
 Barbora Hrzánová as Lenka
 Alena Vránová as mother
 Halina Pawlowská as Vasilina
 Milan Šteindler as StB officer
 Jiří Langmajer as Honza
 Karel Heřmánek as Orest
 Tomáš Hanák as Lesik
 Petr Čepek as famous writer
 Miroslav Etzler as Mirek
 Szidi Tobias as Romka

Awards

See also
 List of submissions to the 68th Academy Awards for Best Foreign Language Film
 List of Czech submissions for the Academy Award for Best Foreign Language Film

References

External links
 

1994 films
1994 comedy films
Czech Lion Awards winners (films)
Czech comedy films